The C0465 RNA is a bacterial non-coding RNA of 78 nucleotides in length that is found between the tar and cheW genes in the genomes of Escherichia coli and Shigella flexneri. This ncRNA was originally identified in E.coli using high-density oligonucleotide probe arrays (microarray).  The function of this ncRNA is unknown.

See also
C0299 RNA
C0343 RNA
C0719 RNA

References

External links
 

Non-coding RNA